Darida is a surname. Notable people with the surname include:

Alexandru Darida (born 1955), American painter 
Clelio Darida (1927–2017), Italian politician
Vladimír Darida (born 1990), Czech footballer

See also
FC Darida Minsk Raion, a defunct Belarusian football club